Max Howard is a film producer and studio executive, based in Los Angeles. He has run studios for Walt Disney Feature Animation  in London, Paris, Orlando and Los Angeles, and was president of Warner Bros. Feature Animation. He has worked on or been responsible for a number of successful film projects. His credits include Who Framed Roger Rabbit, Spirit: Stallion of the Cimarron, and Igor.

He lives in Los Angeles, and runs two independent film companies, Melwood Pictures, and the Max Howard Consulting Group. The group offers the inside track on animation feature production.

Howard has been honoured with a Doctorate of Arts degree from Teesside University in the United Kingdom in recognition for his services to the animation industry.  He is also the Chancellor of Middlesbrough Children's University.

In 2015 Max started working In China on a regular basis for the DeTao Group, where he runs Melwood Pictures at DeTao, and is developing features based on Chinese content.

Filmography
1988 - Who Framed Roger Rabbit - Animation Administrator
1989 - The Little Mermaid - Studio Executive
1990 - The Rescuers Down Under  - Studio Executive
1991 - Beauty and the Beast  - Studio Executive
1992 - Aladdin  - Studio Executive
1994 - The Lion King  - Studio Executive
1995 - Pocahontas  - Studio Executive
1996 - Space Jam - Studio Executive
1998 - Quest For Camelot - Studio Executive
1999 - The Iron Giant  - Studio Executive
2002 - Spirit: Stallion of the Cimarron - Executive producer
2008 - Igor - Producer
2013 - Saving Santa - Executive producer
2014 - The Hero of Color City - Producer
2017 - Bunyan and Babe - Producer

Awards
In 1998 he received a Certificate of Merit at the Annie Awards in Los Angeles.

References

External links
 
Max Howard Consulting Group official website Retrieved October 2011
Interview with Max Howard at Animation Magazine Retrieved October 2011

Living people
Year of birth missing (living people)
British animated film producers
British film producers
Walt Disney Animation Studios people